Counterpoints is the seventh and final album released by British rock band Argent in October 1975 on RCA Victor (United Artists Records in U.S. on 10 April 1976). This was the second studio album recorded without founding member Russ Ballard. John Verity stepped in to fill Ballard's shoes with the previous album Circus (at the recommendation of Ballard) after Verity's band supported Argent on tour 1974 tour. Phil Collins played drums and percussion on Counterpoints while Bob Henrit was ill.

The album received a CD release from the Korean label Big Pink in 2021.

Track listing

All tracks composed by Rod Argent; except where indicated

Personnel
Argent
 Rod Argent – organ, electric piano, vocals
 John Grimaldi – guitar, lap steel guitar, cover artwork
 John Verity - guitar, vocals
 Jim Rodford – bass guitar, guitar, vocals
 Bob Henrit – drums, percussion
with:
 Phil Collins – drums, percussion

References 

Argent (band) albums
1975 albums
Albums produced by Rod Argent
Albums produced by Chris White (musician)
Albums produced by Tony Visconti
RCA Records albums